The  1969 Asian Badminton Championships took place from 3–15 February 1969, in Manila, Philippines. Indonesia won the men's team competition after beating Malaysia 3–2 in the final. The match for third place between Japan and Philippines also ended 3–2.

Medalists

Medal table

Final results

Notes

References 

Badminton Asia Championships
1969 in badminton
1969 in Philippine sport
Sports competitions in Manila